I Will Be There is the third studio album by Filipino R&B singer Kyla. The album was released in 2003 thru Poly East Records under EMI Philippines in CD and cassette format and digital. It is one of the albums released by EMI Philippines with copy-protecting compact discs.

The carrier single is "I Will be There" written by actor-songwriter Ogie Alcasid. The album also included songs, Bounce, Always On Time, a song penned by actor-singer Janno Gibbs called Maghihintay Lamang, Flexin' with UK pop vocal group Blue, and a duet with Gary Valenciano for his original song, Sana Maulit Muli, which won Best Performance By A Duet at the 2004 Awit Awards.

Track listing

Credits
Personnel
Chito Ilacad – executive producer
Mich Hedin Hansen – producer
Jasus Ramirez Garcia – producer
Jonathan Manalo – producer
Gary Valenciano – producer
Ogie Alcasid – producer
Luis Espiritu – stylist
Production
Melanie Calumpad (Kyla) – lead vocals, background vocals
Mon Faustino – engineer, string arrangements, keyboard programming, mixing
Gerry Samson – mastering, mixing, vocal engineer
Ferdie Marquez – arranger, mastering, mixing
Jerry Joanino – engineer, mixing
Arnie Mendaros – vocal arrangement, background vocals
Mich Hedin Hansen – percussion
Joe Belmaati – bass, guitars, keyboards, programming
Arnel Layug – guitars
Benjie Bautista – violin
Gary Valenciano – string arrangements
Jasus Ramirez Garcia – arranger

References

2003 albums
Kyla albums